Matteo Frutti (born 29 January 1975) is an Italian former professional road racing cyclist.

Major results
1993
 1st Stage 3 Grand Prix Rüebliland
1995
 3rd Circuito del Porto
1997
 1st Coppa San Geo
 1st Stage 2 Giro della Valle d'Aosta
 1st Stage 8 Girobio
 2nd Trofeo Franco Balestra
2001
 3rd Tour Beneden-Maas
 10th Paris–Bruxelles

Grand Tour general classification results timeline

References

External links

1975 births
Living people
Italian male cyclists
People from Trescore Balneario
Cyclists from the Province of Bergamo